Edgar Solano Paredes (born 26 October 1978) is a Mexican former professional footballer.

Career 
Born in Mexico City, Solano began playing professional football with Club Necaxa, where he debuted in the Primera División during 1997. Solano joined Club Atlas before the 2000 Invierno tournament, and would return to Necaxa before the 2001 Invierno tournament to seek regular play. Necaxa transferred him to Atlante before the 2003 Clausura tournament, where he established himself as an important player under manager Miguel Herrera. In the 2003 Apertura Tournament he became a stronghold of the Atlante defense, sparking interest from Monarcas Morelia. Morelia acquired Solano before the Clausura 2004 tournament, and here he would experience the highest level of success in his career. Following his success with Morelia, Solano had brief spells Jaguares de Chiapas and C.F. Monterrey before returning to his first club, Necaxa. After leaving Necaxa a third time, Solano signed with Tiburones Rojos de Veracruz of the Liga de Ascenso where injury prevented him from playing.

International career 
Solano made seven appearances for the Mexico national under-23 football team and participated in the 2000 CONCACAF Olympic Qualifying Tournament.

Honours
Necaxa
 Primera División de México: Invierno 1998
CONCACAF Champions League: 1999

References

External links 
 
 

1978 births
Club Necaxa footballers
C.D. Veracruz footballers
Atlas F.C. footballers
Atlante F.C. footballers
Atlético Morelia players
C.F. Monterrey players
Chiapas F.C. footballers
Footballers from Mexico City
Mexican footballers
Living people
Association football defenders
Club León non-playing staff
Club Necaxa non-playing staff
Club América non-playing staff
Querétaro F.C. non-playing staff
Liga MX players
Ascenso MX players